General elections were held in Republika Srpska on 2 October 2022 as part of the Bosnian general elections. Voters decided the President of Republika Srpska and the 83 members of the National Assembly of Republika Srpska.

Incumbent president Željka Cvijanović was eligible to run for a second four-year term, but opted not to do so, instead deciding to run for Serb member of the Presidency of Bosnia and Herzegovina. Instead of Cvijanović, former president and incumbent Serb member of the Bosnian Presidency Milorad Dodik decided to run for president once again.

Results

President
Partial results with 2,239 out of the 2,239 (100.00%) polling stations counted are shown below. On 10 October, the Central Election Commission ordered a recount of all ballots cast after reports of fraud.

National Assembly

For the National Assembly, 63 seats are allocated to each of the nine electoral units and a further 20 "compensation seats" are allocated to ensure proportionality.

Allegations of voter fraud

Following the release of the preliminary results, opposition parties filed accusations of electoral fraud direct against Milorad Dodik who they claimed coordinated stuffing ballot boxes with thousands of illegal votes to put the Alliance of Independent Social Democrats ahead in the polls and that Jelena Trivić was the true winner of the presidential election. As a result of the allegations, the central electoral commission conducted a recount of the preliminary results for the Republika Srpska alongside the rest of the country's elections. On 22 October, it confirmed the presidential and parliamentary results. On 27 October, officials confirmed Dodik's victory. The commission noted that while there were irregularities, none were on a level that would have changed the outcome of the election.

Aftermath and government formation

On 23 November 2022, President Dodik stated that he had given the mandate to form a government to the incumbent Prime Minister Radovan Višković and expects him to be elected in the first week of December 2022 with the support of 53 members of parliament. Eventually on 21 December 2022, the assembly elected a new government headed by Višković with the support of 51 among the 74 assembly members being present.
The ministries were distributed according to party strength, with 10 being allocated to the SSND, two to the SP and one portfolio each for DEMOS, the Greens, the People's Party of Srpska, and US.

See also
2022 Bosnian general election
2022 Federation of Bosnia and Herzegovina general election

Notes

References

Republika Srpska
2022 in Bosnia and Herzegovina
Elections in Republika Srpska